Robert Walker (born 20 March 1970) is a former Australian rules footballer who played with Richmond in the Australian Football League (AFL).

Walker, recruited from De La Salle College, played five senior AFL games, over three seasons at Richmond. He went to Hawthorn in the 1993 Pre-Season Draft but didn't make any league appearances for the club.

References

External links
 
 

1970 births
Australian rules footballers from Victoria (Australia)
Richmond Football Club players
De La Salle OC Amateur Football Club players
Living people